Echegaray is a crater on Mercury.  Its name was adopted by the International Astronomical Union (IAU) in 1985. Echegaray is named for the Spanish dramatist José Echegaray.

To the south of Echegaray is Gluck crater.  To the east is Monet, and to the northwest is Sor Juana.

References

Impact craters on Mercury